Marcel Henri Claude Reyes (born in Santiago, Chile on 26 February 1957) is a Chilean economist, academic, and political activist. He was an independent candidate to become President of Chile in the 2013 Chilean presidential election, and has been endorsed by the Humanist Party.

Previously, Claude worked at the Central Bank of Chile between 1983 and 1995, and later directed two Chilean environmental NGOs.

Early life
Claude was born on 26 February 1957 in Santiago de Chile to Rolande Hugo Claude Dellepiane, a native of Concepción, and Leyla del Carmen Reyes Maluje.

In 1975, he enrolled in the University of Chile, and graduated in 1982 with a degree in economics. After that, he got an educational scholarship at the Université catholique de Louvain, Belgium, in 1986 and got a degree in Master of Arts in 1987. At the same university, he was a candidate for a Doctorate in Economy Science.

On 25 July 1986, he married Oriella Celsi Tasso.

Professional career

Central Bank of Chile
Claude started his career at the Central Bank of Chile in 1983. He served as an economic analyst and wrote reports regarding external debt and possible solutions to this problem, among other themes. He wrote a seminal report on the state of external debt in Latin America, among others. During this period he was a professor of economic development at the Catholic University of Valparaíso.

Environmentalist NGOs
In 1997, after completing his work at the Central Bank, Claude created the Terram Foundation, whose objective was to promote sustainable development in Chile.

In April 2003, he became the executive director of the Office for South America and Antarctica of Oceana.

References

External links
Official campaign web site, in Spanish.
 Terram Foundation website in English
 

1957 births
Living people
Chilean people of French descent
Chilean people of Italian descent
Chilean activists
20th-century Chilean economists
Université catholique de Louvain alumni
People from Santiago
University of Chile alumni
Chilean humanists
Candidates for President of Chile
Christian Democratic Party (Chile) politicians
Party for Democracy (Chile) politicians
Humanist Party (Chile) politicians
21st-century Chilean economists